The 1966 National Soccer League season was the forty-third season under the National Soccer League (NSL) name. The season began in late May and concluded in late October with Windsor Teutonia claiming their first NSL Championship against Toronto Croatia. The regular-season title was secured by Sudbury Italia by finishing first throughout the regular season. 

The ownership of Stanley Park Stadium was transferred back to the city of Toronto as the league accumulated a heavy debt, and failed to make the necessary payments to retain the ownership. After the conclusion of the 1966 season, the Eastern Canada Professional Soccer League (ECPSL) merged with the National Soccer League.

Overview 
The league's ownership of Stanley Park Stadium was put further in jeopardy as the league officials were summoned to the Toronto Board of Control to address the outstanding debt owed to the city, and other financial institutions. Originally the board members voted to repossess the stadium, and place it under the control of the Toronto Department of Parks and Recreation. The decision was later rescinded and an agreement was reached which required the league to pay only their taxes owed from the 1963 season within eight weeks. If the league failed to pay the installment within the time frame then the city would take possession of the stadium. The league ownership, unfortunately, failed to honor the agreement, and the stadium was transferred back to the ownership of the city. The city assumed the league's debts, and in return charged the league for the usage of the faculty in hopes of repaying off the debt. 

The membership in the National Soccer League decreased from twelve to eight clubs. The departing clubs were Toronto Abruzzi, Toronto Azzurri, and Toronto Hakoah while Toronto Olympia took a sabbatical. The attendance at Stanley Park Stadium saw a 25% increase since their initial decrease in the early 1960s. Signs of financial difficulties were becoming apparent with the NSL's competitor the Eastern Canada Professional Soccer League as some teams were expressing intentions of defecting to American-based leagues. The reports proved to be factual as the ECPSL decided to merge with the NSL after the conclusion of both seasons. The initial intentions of the merger consisted of plans of transforming the NSL into a feeder league for the ECPSL with further expansion throughout the country and into the United States. Ultimately the result of the merger saw the remaining ECPSL clubs join the NSL and elevate the status of the NSL to a secondary league behind the American-based National Professional Soccer League, and the United Soccer Association.

Teams

Standings

Playoffs 
The preliminary round of the playoffs was contested in a round-robin style with two separate groups where the two group winners would qualify for the final. Sudbury Italia, Toronto Croatia, and Toronto Ukrainia were placed in the first group, while Toronto Hellas, Toronto Hungaria, and Windsor Teutonia were placed in the second group. Croatia and Windsor finished as their respective group champions, and as a result, qualified for the NSL Championship final. The championship final was originally scheduled in a best-of-three series but was later changed to a two-game series.

Finals

References

External links
RSSSF CNSL page
thecnsl.com - 1966 season

1966–67 domestic association football leagues
National Soccer League
1966